Co Derr (21 July 1921 – 27 April 2011) was a Dutch sculptor. His work was part of the sculpture event in the art competition at the 1948 Summer Olympics.

References

1921 births
2011 deaths
20th-century Dutch sculptors
Dutch male sculptors
Olympic competitors in art competitions
Artists from Amsterdam
20th-century Dutch male artists